NE 130th Street is a future station on Sound Transit's Link light rail system in Seattle, Washington, United States. It would be built on a section of the Lynnwood Link Extension, adjacent to the intersection of Interstate 5 and Northeast 130th Street in northern Seattle. The station was originally deferred from Lynnwood Link but restored as an infill station project under the Sound Transit 3 ballot measure, with an opening tentatively set for 2026.

Location

The station will be located along the east side of Interstate 5 at its interchange with Northeast 130th Street and Roosevelt Way Northeast near Haller Lake and the Jackson Park golf course. It will serve several outlying neighborhoods, including Bitter Lake and Lake City, with proposed bus connections.

Sound Transit initially estimated that the station would serve less than 1,000 daily riders by 2040, but ridership would grow if the area around the station are proposed and approved. A revised estimate in 2021 projected 3,100 to 4,600 daily riders, of which most would switch from adjacent stations.

History

The 130th Street station was deferred from the final plans for the Lynnwood Link Extension, which was approved by the Sound Transit Board on April 23, 2015. Instead, a provision for future accommodation for construction of the station without impacting service was included in the board's resolution, at an estimated cost of $10 million.

The station's construction was supported by advocacy groups from surrounding neighborhoods, including Bitter Lake to the west and Lake City to the east. The Seattle City Council passed a resolution in October 2013 recommending the inclusion of a station at NE 130th Street in the final environmental impact statement for the Lynnwood Link project. In March 2016, city councilmember Debora Juarez of the 5th district, which encompasses most of north Seattle that would be served by the station, criticized its exclusion and lack of priority when compared to other proposals in the Sound Transit 3 plan. She called the station "the focal point of a powerful east–west transit connection", citing a population of 90,000 residents who could benefit from feeder bus service to the station. The city council also recommended the formation of an urban area at the site of the proposed station, allowing for increased building heights and mixed-use development under the city's comprehensive plan. A 2013 report from Sound Transit determined that the station area held limited potential for transit-oriented development, citing existing single-family homes, the presence of Jackson Park and other undevelopable areas, and the low desirability for retail to develop at the site when considering proximity to Northgate Mall. Sound Transit expressed concerns over the inclusion of NE 130th Street station in the Lynnwood Link Extension, including a possible loss of federal funding proposed for the project after the record of decision was published without the station.

The draft plan for Sound Transit 3, a ballot measure for light rail expansion, was revised in May 2016 to include $80 million for an infill station at NE 130th Street that could open in 2031. Earlier plans had listed the station as provisional, deferred until additional funding could be found, but lobbying to the Sound Transit Board by Seattle councilmembers allowed for the amendment to pass unanimously.

A proposal to open the station as soon as 2025 was presented to Sound Transit in January 2020, costing $23 million less than the estimate to build the station in 2031, but requiring additional debt to be raised sooner. In February 2020, the Sound Transit Board approved $29 million in funds for final engineering of the NE 130th Street station, with the goal of opening in 2025. Accelerated construction of the station is expected to cost $144 million. Due to the COVID-19 pandemic and its effects on local sales tax revenue, Sound Transit considered delaying the projected opening to 2036. The Sound Transit Board voted in August 2021 to maintain the projected 2025 opening by transferring funds from a delayed parking garage in Lake Forest Park. The station foundations and substructure were completed in early 2022 as part of work for the Lynnwood Link Extension. In June 2022, the board approved a $240 million budget to construct the NE 130th station, which would open in mid-2026.

References

External links
Project website

Future Link light rail stations
Link light rail stations in Seattle
Railway stations scheduled to open in 2026